Copley (born January 18, 1992) is an American professional ice hockey goaltender for the  Los Angeles Kings of the National Hockey League (NHL).

Playing career

USHL and College
Undrafted, Copley played in the United States Hockey League (USHL) with the Tri-City Storm and Des Moines Buccaneers before committing to play collegiate hockey with Michigan Tech of the Western Collegiate Hockey Association (WCHA). At the conclusion of his sophomore season, Copley opted to turn professional in agreeing to a two-year entry-level contract with the Washington Capitals on March 20, 2014.

Washington Capitals
Copley was assigned to AHL affiliate, the Hershey Bears, to begin his first full professional season in 2014–15. In sharing the crease, he impressed with the Bears, earning 17 wins in 26 games. In the off-season, Copley was included in a trade, which also included Troy Brouwer and a third-round pick in 2016, to the St. Louis Blues in exchange for T. J. Oshie on July 2, 2015.

In the 2015–16 season, Copley made his NHL debut with the Blues in relief in a defeat to the Nashville Predators on February 27, 2016.

During the 2016–17 season, on January 20, 2017, Copley was recalled from the Chicago Wolves of the AHL by the Blues. He made the first start of his NHL career on January 21 against the Winnipeg Jets, where the Blues lost 5–3. After he was returned to the Wolves, on February 27, 2017, Copley was traded back to the Capitals in a deadline trade along with Kevin Shattenkirk in exchange for Zach Sanford, Brad Malone, a 2017 first-round pick, and a conditional second-round pick in 2019. Copley was called up to the NHL during the Capitals' 2018 Stanley Cup playoffs run and although he did not play during the playoffs, he stayed with the team as they won the 2018 Stanley Cup.

Copley made the Capitals opening-night roster to begin the 2018–19 season. He recorded his first NHL win in a 4–3 shootout win over the Calgary Flames on October 27, 2018. He spent the 2019–20 and 2020–21 seasons with the Hershey Bears, where he earned the Harry "Hap" Holmes Memorial Award with Zachary Fucale for the 2020–21 season's best save percentage.

Los Angeles Kings
As a free agent following the 2021–22 season, Copley signed a one-year, $850,000 contract with the Los Angeles Kings on July 13, 2022. After Kings goaltenders Cal Petersen and Jonathan Quick struggled at the start of the 2022–23 season, the Kings called up Copley from the AHL in December 2022. Copley would quickly established himself as the team's starting goaltender, becoming just the fifth goaltender in franchise history to win seven games in a row.

Personal life
Copley was born on January 18, 1992, in North Pole, Alaska, to parents Peter Copley and Mary Sanford. His older brother Navarone also plays ice hockey. At a young age, his family moved to Ohio so his father could pursue an advanced degree. Eventually, his parents divorced and Mary, Navarone and  moved back to Alaska. In honor of his birthplace, Copley has candy canes on his goaltender mask.

Career statistics

References

External links

 

1992 births
Living people
American men's ice hockey goaltenders
Chicago Wolves players
Des Moines Buccaneers players
Hershey Bears players
Ice hockey players from Alaska
Los Angeles Kings players
Michigan Tech Huskies men's ice hockey players
Ontario Reign (AHL) players
People from North Pole, Alaska
South Carolina Stingrays players
St. Louis Blues players
Tri-City Storm players
Undrafted National Hockey League players
Washington Capitals players